Floyd E. Wagner (June 13, 1898September 28, 1983) was an American politician from Michigan.

Early life and education
Wagner was born on June 13, 1898 in Cass County, Michigan. Wagner attended the South Bend College of Commerce.

Career
Wagner served as chairman of the War Price Rationing Board. Wagner served as postmaster in Vandalia for five years. Wagner served as the clerk of Cass County from 1941 to 1958. Wagner served in other positions in local government, and served on various school, village and township boards. On November 4, 1958, Wagner was elected to the Michigan House of Representatives, where represented the St. Joseph County district from January 14, 1959 to December 31, 1964. In 1965, the state house went from county based districts to numbered districts. For Wagner's last term in the state house, Wagner represented the newly created 42nd district from January 13, 1965 to December 31, 1966.

Personal life
On September 8, 1917, Wagner married Esther Z. English. Together, they had four children. Wagner was a Freemason and a member of the Elks.

Death
Wagner died in Cassopolis, Michigan on September 28, 1983.

References

1898 births
1983 deaths
American Freemasons
Michigan postmasters
County officials in Michigan
People from Cass County, Michigan
Republican Party members of the Michigan House of Representatives
School board members in Michigan
20th-century American politicians